Just the Ten of Us is an American sitcom starring stand-up comedian Bill Kirchenbauer as Coach Graham Lubbock, a teacher and the head of a large Catholic family with eight children living in Eureka, California. The series is a spin-off of Growing Pains, in which Kirchenbauer portrayed the same character on a recurring basis. As the series progressed, Coach Lubbock's four eldest daughters, the teenagers Marie (Heather Langenkamp), Cindy (Jamie Luner), Wendy (Brooke Theiss), and Connie (JoAnn Willette), became the primary focus of the show.

Just the Ten of Us aired on ABC starting with a trial run from April 26 to May 17, 1988. After the first four episodes in an abbreviated first season were aired, the show was renewed for two more seasons, eventually ending after 47 episodes on May 4, 1990. The show was a part of ABC's early TGIF programming block.

Synopsis 
The series focuses on Graham Lubbock (Bill Kirchenbauer), a Catholic gym teacher who used to teach at the high school that Growing Pains characters Mike and Carol Seaver (Kirk Cameron and Tracey Gold) had attended on Long Island, and the father of eight children.

In the pilot episode (which aired on Growing Pains in the spring of 1988), Graham's job is in jeopardy due to district budget cutbacks. Mike leads a protest after he learns that Lubbock is trying to support a large family (including yet another baby on the way). Despite this, Graham loses his job but soon receives an offer at St. Augustine's Academy, an all-boys private Catholic school in Eureka, California. Graham and his pregnant wife Elizabeth promptly move their family to California.

By special arrangement, the older children — four teenage girls — were allowed to attend St. Augustine's, much to the chagrin of the school's administration (and, of course, the delight of the male students). They were:

 Marie (Heather Langenkamp) – the oldest, most responsible, and most pious.
 Cindy (Jamie Luner) – Wendy's older twin sister, and the most ditzy.
 Wendy (Brooke Theiss) – Cindy's younger twin sister, and the most flirtatious.
 Connie (JoAnn Willette) – the Bohemian, and also occasionally agnostic.

The younger children — two girls and two boys — were:

 11-year-old Graham, Jr. (Matt Shakman), familiarly known as "J.R."
 eight-year-old Sherry (Heidi Zeigler) 
 toddler Harvey (Jason and Jeremy Korstjens)
 infant Melissa – not yet born when the show began.

The first season consisted of four episodes for a trial run in the spring of 1988. ABC was pleased with their success and ordered a second season. In the second season, Cindy and Wendy seemed to switch personalities, with Cindy becoming more ditzy, and Wendy becoming the schemer.  Also, the show focused more and more on the four older girls and frequently revolved around the family's efforts to save money, dating, and other typical family sitcom issues. In later episodes, the four teenage girls formed a singing group called "The Lubbock Babes" (partly to help bring in much-needed extra income). The girls had many boyfriends and love interests that Graham took great pride in testing—and in most cases, fending off—but the most permanent fixture among them was Marie's goofy boyfriend, Gavin Doosler (Evan Arnold).

Those on the St. Augustine's staff included Father Robert Hargis (Frank Bonner), the affable headmaster; Coach Duane Johnson (Dennis Haysbert), Graham's earnest young assistant during the first two seasons and pulled some strings with Father Hargis to hire Lubbock; and in the third season, featured teachers Father Budd (Lou Richards) and elderly, madcap Sister Ethel (Maxine Elliott).

Cast

 Bill Kirchenbauer as Coach Graham T. Lubbock
 Deborah Harmon as Elizabeth Lubbock
 Heather Langenkamp as Marie Lubbock
 Jamie Luner as Cynthia "Cindy" Lubbock
 Brooke Theiss as Wendy Lubbock
 JoAnn Willette as Constance Sarah "Connie" Lubbock
 Matt Shakman as Graham "J.R." Lubbock, Jr.
 Heidi Zeigler as Sherry Lubbock
 Jason and Jeremy Korstjens as Harvey Lubbock
 Frank Bonner as Father Frank Hargis, Headmaster of St. Augustine's Academy
 Dennis Haysbert as Duane Johnson, Coach Lubbock's assistant (1988–1989)
 Evan Arnold as Gavin Doosler
 Lou Richards as Father Bud (1989–1990)
 Maxine Elliott as Sister Ethel (1989–1990)

Response

Ratings
A week after the series debuted on April 8, 1988, the show placed 7th in ratings. The second season garnered a total of 20.1 million viewers.

Episodes

Syndication
USA Network picked up the entire series in reruns shortly after it was canceled, and aired the show on a daily basis until 1996.

Awards and nominations

See also
 The Brady Bunch (1969)
 Eight Is Enough (1977)

References

External links 
 

1980s American sitcoms
1990s American sitcoms
1988 American television series debuts
1990 American television series endings
American Broadcasting Company original programming
American television spin-offs
English-language television shows
Growing Pains
Television series about families
Television series by Warner Bros. Television Studios
Television shows set in California
TGIF (TV programming block)